Hiding is obscuring something from view or rendering it inconspicuous. It may refer to:

 Hiding (programming), of inherited methods in object-oriented computer programming
 Hiding (TV series), a 2015 Australian television series
 Christoffer Hiding (born 1985), a Swedish singer
 Information hiding, in computer science, the hiding of design decisions in a computer program

See also
 Hiding in Plain Sight (disambiguation)
 Hiding Place (disambiguation)
 Hide (disambiguation)
 Hide and Seek (disambiguation)

pt:Esconderijo
zh:棄保潛逃